The 2009–10 Purdue Boilermakers men's basketball team represented Purdue University. The head coach was Matt Painter, then in his fifth season with the Boilers. The team played its home games in Mackey Arena in West Lafayette, Indiana, as a member of the Big Ten Conference.

They made the NCAA Tournament where they were the 4th seed. They defeated #13 Siena in the first round, #5 Texas A&M in the second round, before losing to the champions #1 Duke in the Sweet Sixteen.

Season notes
 Junior guard E'Twaun Moore, forward Robbie Hummel, forward/center JaJuan Johnson, along with senior guard Keaton Grant, each scored their 1,000th career point. 
 Keaton Grant broke the school record with most career games, eclipsing Marcus Green's 132 mark set last season with 138.
 Robbie Hummel broke the school record of consecutive free throws made, making 36, breaking Jerry Sichting's prior mark of 34.
 Robbie Hummel made 8 three point-field goals in a game, tying Cuonzo Martin's sixteen-year-old school record.
 Senior guard Chris Kramer broke Brian Cardinal's 259 career steals mark, giving Kramer the school's career steals record with an eventual 274.
 The team's 14–0 start on the season is tied for the best in Purdue Men's basketball history, along with its first undefeated preseason record since the 1993–94 season.
 With a victory over Minnesota on January 5, 2010, Purdue won its 500th game at Mackey Arena.
 Robbie Hummel became the first Boilermaker to score 35 points in a game since Carl Landry did in 2005.
 Head coach Matt Painter won his 100th game as Purdue's head coach with a victory over Wisconsin on January 28, 2010.
 Purdue became the first and only team in Big Ten Conference history to beat Indiana, Michigan State, Ohio State, Illinois, and Minnesota on the road in a single season.
 Purdue received a #3 ranking in both major polls, giving the program its highest since 1994. 
 Robbie Hummel suffered a torn anterior cruciate ligament on February 24, 2010 in a road game against Minnesota, prematurely ending his season.
 The 2010 senior class became the winningest class in school history, surpassing the 98 wins mark with 102.
 Purdue won its 22nd Big Ten Conference title, the most of any Big Ten school and its first in fourteen years.
 Coach Matt Painter was named the Big Ten Coach of the Year for the second time in three years.
 Both E'Twaun Moore and Robbie Hummel were named First Team All-Big Ten, the first time for multiple Boilermakers since 1988.
 Kelsey Barlow was named to the Big Ten All-Freshman Team, becoming the fifth Boiler in four years with the honor.
 Chris Kramer received his second Big Ten Defensive Player of the Year honors.
 Purdue reached a second straight Sweet Sixteen appearance in the NCAA tournament.
 Purdue's 29 wins on the season tied the most in school history with the 1993–94 team.

Roster

Incoming recruits

Schedule 

|-
!colspan=10| Exhibition
|-

|-
!colspan=10| Regular season
|-

|-
!colspan=10| Big Ten tournament

|-
!colspan=10| NCAA tournamentSouth Region

Rankings

Gallery

2010 Signing Class

See also
2010 NCAA Division I men's basketball tournament
2009-10 NCAA Division I men's basketball season
2009-10 NCAA Division I men's basketball rankings
List of NCAA Division I institutions

References

Purdue
Purdue Boilermakers men's basketball seasons
Purdue
Purd
Purd